Ještěd A is a ski jumping hill, located in Liberec, Czech Republic. FIS Nordic World Ski Championships 2009 was held there. The K-spot is located at 120 metres. The hill size is 134 m.

Ještěd B is a ski jumping hill, located in Liberec, Czech Republic. FIS Nordic World Ski Championships 2009 was held there. The K-spot is located at 90 metres. The hill size is 100 m.

References

Ski jumping venues in the Czech Republic
Sport in Liberec
Sports venues in the Liberec Region
Buildings and structures in Liberec